The Foundation for Technology Assessment TA-SWISS is a Centre of Competence of the Swiss Academies of Arts and Sciences, based on a mandate in the Swiss federal law on research. It is an advisory body, financed by public money, and devoted to technology assessment. (The abbreviation «TA» which is used to describe TA-SWISS stands for Technology Assessment, and reflects the activities of the Centre.)

Mission
The object of the Foundation for Technology Assessment TA-SWISS is to follow technological changes and developments and to identify the social, legal and ethical consequences of new technologies. Another element of its mission is to encourage the discussion of scientific and technological challenges.

The recommendations that result from TA-SWISS projects are used to assist the decision making process, and are intended for the Swiss Parliament and the Federal Council. Depending on the topics covered, these recommendations may also be of interest to other groups, such as professional associations, commercial enterprises, universities and stakeholder groups, as well as public administrations. The media, in their role as disseminators of information, are also kept regularly informed about the activities of TA-SWISS.

TA-Swiss is full member of the European Parliamentary Technology Assessment (EPTA) network and is a founding member of the German speaking Network NTA (Netzwerk Technikfolgenabschätzung).

Activities
The activities of the Foundation for Technology Assessment TA-SWISS are further divided into two areas:

1. Studies (interdisciplinary scientific analyses)
Recent studies have covered the following topics:
 Flexible new world of work (2014)
 Prenatal genetic diagnostics (2014)
 Synthetic Biology (2014)
 Deep geothermal energy (2014)
 Personalised Medicine (2013)
 Nano and Environment (2013)
 Electromobility (2012)
 Robotics (2012)
 Localisation Technologies (2012)
 Human Enhancement (2011)
 Biomass fuels – second generation (2010)
 Indicator-based decision-making systems (2010)
 Nanofood (2009)
 Anti-aging medicine – myths and chances (2008)

2. Participative projects (consultations aimed at gathering the views of citizens)
Numerous events have been organised within the scope of the participative projects – PubliForums, publifocus and other forms of dialogue, for example:
 publifocus «Medical treatments» (2012)
 Dialogue «The Internet and me» (2010)
 World Wide Views on Global Warming (2009)
 publifocus eHealth and the electronic patient file (2008)

History
Experimental beginnings: TA-SWISS began its work in 1992. Following a number of parliamentary interventions, the Federal Council assigned the Swiss Science and Technology Council the task of developing a system of technology assessment for Switzerland over a four-year pilot phase (1992–1995).

Institutionalisation of technology assessment: In its Message relating to the promotion of training, research and technology for the years 1996-1999, the Federal Council defined the bases for the institutionalisation and financing of technology assessment in Switzerland. In 1999, technology assessment was firmly fixed in the law on research. In this way, the Federal Council reinforced the independence of TA-SWISS, which until 2007 was affiliated to the Swiss Science and Technology Council.

In 2008 a change in the law on research conferred the legal basis on the incorporation of the mandate for TA-SWISS within the Association of Swiss Academies of Arts and Sciences. Accordingly, since 1 January 2008 TA-SWISS has been a Centre for Excellence of the Swiss Academies of Arts and Sciences.

See also 
 Citizen science
 Participatory monitoring
 Participatory action research

References

External links
 Official website of TA-SWISS

Technology assessment organisations
Scientific organisations based in Switzerland